is a Japanese voice actress who works for Aoni Production.

Filmography

Anime television series

Lu and Su in Blue Gender
Higuma-san in Bonobono
Nene-chan's Mom in Crayon Shin-chan
Misaki Sakura in Hanasaka Tenshi Ten-Ten-kun
Cookie in Kishin Corps
VesVes in Sailor Moon Supers
Kanta Hanamura in Sally, the Witch
Natsuko Tanaka in Aoki Densetsu Shoot
Noriko Ikawa in Tsuyoshi Shikkari Shinasai

Game

 Sora no Erina in Galaxy Fraulein Yuna
 Saki in Grandia
 Nall in Lunar: Silver Star Story
 Freya in Magna Carta
 Marc Brown and a Stewardess in Policenauts
 Rea in Ys IV: The Dawn of Ys

References

External links

 

Living people
Voice actresses from Hyōgo Prefecture
Japanese voice actresses
1964 births